Eoophyla nymphulalis is a moth in the family Crambidae first described by George Hampson in 1906. It is found in South Africa.

The wingspan is about 18 mm. The forewings are fuscous with a whitish median fascia and subterminal fascia. The hindwings are pale fuscous with whitish lines.

References

Endemic moths of South Africa
Eoophyla
Moths of Africa